Stress in Spanish is functional: to change the placement of stress changes the meaning of a sentence or phrase: for example, célebre ('famous'), celebre ('[that] he/she celebrates'), and celebré ('I celebrated') contrast only by stress.

Transcription
Spanish has only two degrees of stress. In traditional transcription, primary stress is marked with an acute accent (´) over the vowel. Unstressed parts of a word are emphasized by placing a breve (˘) over the vowel if a mark is needed, or it is left unmarked.

Position
Stress usually occurs in three positions in Spanish: on the final syllable (oxytone, e.g. señor, ciudad), the penultimate syllable (paroxytone, e.g. señora, nosotros), or the antepenultimate syllable (proparoxytone, e.g. teléfono, sábado), although in very rare cases, it can come on the fourth-to-last syllable in compound words (see below). Vowel-final words and those ending in -s or -n are usually stressed on the penultimate syllable. That accounts for around 80% of Spanish vocabulary.

There are almost no Spanish words with antepenultimate stress that have a complex syllable rime in the penult.
The trilled , the palatal nasal , and the palatal lateral  are similarly excluded from the final syllable of proparoxytones. Thus  'trawling net' is allowed, but the made-up  can be considered ungrammatical. That said, Spanish does have some words containing antepenultimate stress and trills in the final syllable onset, which are typically of onomatopoeic, Basque, or unknown origin:  'pretexts' (onomatopoeic),  (a last name of Basque origin),  'type of wasp'.

In addition, words that end in a falling diphthong almost always have final stress:  'tortoise' is allowed but made-up  isn't.

In addition, some of Chilean Spanish's voseo verb forms end in falling diphthongs but are stressed on the penultimate syllable. For example,  'you were dancing' ends on an unstressed falling diphthong.

Creating contrasts
All Spanish words have at least one stressed syllable when they are used in isolation. The word para  can be a verb (the singular pronoun form of "stop") or a preposition (in order to, for). When words are used in a phrase the stress can be dropped depending on the part of speech. Para el coche can mean "stop the car" if the stress remains. If the stress is removed, it means "for the car". Some pairs of stressed and unstressed words are distinguished in writing by using a differential accent: sí 'yes' (stressed) — si 'if' (unstressed when used in a phrase).

In English, contrasts are made by reducing vowels, changing the loudness of the word, or changing the intonation of the phrase. For example, this is her car  emphasizes the owner of the car. If the stress is changed to say this is her car , the emphasis is on showing what object belongs to a specific person. In Spanish, the stress is almost always changed by reordering the words. Using the same example este coche es suyo emphasizes the owner and éste es su coche emphasizes the object.

Word stress categories
All Spanish words can be classified into one of four groups based on the position of their stress. If the last syllable is stressed it falls into the aguda category. Aguda words generally end in a consonant other than n or s, or are a conjugated verb that ends in an accented, stressed vowel.  If the stress falls on the second to last syllable, it is classified as a llana or grave. Llanas typically are words that end in n, s, or a vowel. Any exceptions have a written accent. If the stress is placed on the third to last or the fourth to last syllable, they are categorized as esdrújulas or sobresdrújulas, respectively. In either of the last two categories, the stressed syllable must be accented to break the rules of the first two categories. No single Spanish word is classified as a sobresdrújula, only compound verbs like diciéndonosla (diciendo-nos-la; telling it to us).
While certain adverbs ending in  have accent marks before the third syllable, these are not considered . For example,  'slowly' is pronounced .

References

External links
 

Spanish phonology
Stress (linguistics)